{|

{{Infobox ship characteristics
|Hide header=
|Header caption=
|Ship class=[[Sassaba class tug|Sassaba-class]] harbor tug
|Ship type=
|Ship tonnage=
|Ship displacement=*260 tons
345 tons (full)
|Ship length= 
|Ship beam= 
|Ship height=
|Ship draught= 
|Ship draft= (full)
|Ship depth=
|Ship hold depth=
|Ship decks=
|Ship deck clearance=
|Ship ramps=
|Ship ice class=
|Ship power=
|Ship propulsion=
|Ship sail plan=
|Ship speed=
|Ship range=
|Ship endurance=
|Ship test depth=
|Ship boats=
|Ship capacity=
|Ship troops=
|Ship complement=14
|Ship crew=
|Ship time to activate=
|Ship sensors=
|Ship EW=
|Ship armament= 2 x  machine guns
|Ship armour= 
|Ship armor=
|Ship aircraft=
|Ship aircraft facilities=
|Ship notes=
}}
|}Connewango'' was authorized as YT-388, but reclassified YTB-388 on 15 May 1944 prior to launching by the Consolidated Shipbuilding Corporation, Morris Heights, New York, on 29 July of that year. Completed in November, she was assigned to the 3rd Naval District where she performed patrol and towing duties. In 1946 she was transferred to the 6th Naval District where she continued until being struck in 1986.

References
 
 NavSource Online: Service Ship Photo Archive Connewango (YTM-388)

Sassaba-class tugs
Ships built in Morris Heights, Bronx
1944 ships
World War II auxiliary ships of the United States